Klaus-Peter Stollberg (born 15 September, 1959 in East Germany) was a German judoka. He retired in 1988. He is a 6th-degree black belt. Since 1992 he has worked as a coach in Austria.

References

External links
 

Living people
1959 births
German male judoka
20th-century German people
21st-century German people